Everybody Move (To the Mixes) is a dance remix album released by Cathy Dennis featuring remixes of the singles from her debut album Move to This, some of which had not been commercially available prior to its release. The album was also included as the second disc in a special edition of Dennis' 1992 album Into the Skyline.

Track listing

References

Cathy Dennis albums
1991 EPs
1991 remix albums
Remix EPs